Cameron "Cam" Crawford (born 14 November 1988) is an Australian professional rugby union player who plays for the  in Super Rugby as a full back.

Early years
As a schoolboy, Crawford represented Sydney Grammar School and was selected in the Combined GPS 2nd XV, having been kept out of the 1st XV by Kurtley Beale. Crawford played his junior rugby for Lindfield.

Career
Crawford spent several years playing Shute Shield for Northern Suburbs Rugby Club.

Brumbies

Waratahs
Crawford enjoyed a successful 2013 Super Rugby season. Crawford's 8 tries from 7 appearances in the 2013 season made him the league's second highest try-scorer over the regular season, behind Frank Halai.
Following such a successful debut season, Crawford was widely expected to become a Wallabies "bolter" under Ewen McKenzie, however, injury and surgery kept Crawford out of action for the remainder of 2013. Ironically, it was his winger partner at the Waratahs, Peter Betham that went on to make his Wallabies debut against the All Blacks in Dunedin.

Crawford was a member of the Waratahs squad for the 2014 Super Rugby season, in which the team won its first Super Rugby title.

Rebels
He scored his first try for the side in a loss to the Hurricanes in April 2016.

Super Rugby statistics

References

External links
Rebels profile

1988 births
Australian rugby union players
ACT Brumbies players
New South Wales Waratahs players
Sydney (NRC team) players
Melbourne Rebels players
Rugby union wings
People educated at Sydney Grammar School
Rugby union players from Sydney
Living people